Elsie de Brauw (born 30 July 1960) is a Dutch actress.

Career 

She won the Theo d'Or award twice: in 2006 and in 2011.

In 2007, she won the Golden Calf for Best Actress award for her role in the film Tussenstand directed by Mijke de Jong.

Awards 

 2006: Theo d'Or
 2007: Golden Calf for Best Actress, Tussenstand
 2011: Theo d'Or

Selected filmography 

 1995: Antonia's Line
 1999: Mates
 2003: Cloaca
 2004: Bluebird
 2017: Disappearance

References

External links 

 

1960 births
Living people
20th-century Dutch actresses
21st-century Dutch actresses
Dutch film actresses
Golden Calf winners